Gregory of Nin was a medieval bishop of Nin who strongly opposed the pope and official circles of the Church and introduced the Croatian language in the religious services after the Great Assembly in 926, according to traditional Croatian historiography. Until that time, services were held only in Latin (being under the jurisdiction of Roman influence before the Great Schism), not being understandable to a majority of the population. Not only was this important for Croatian language and culture, but it also made Christianity stronger within the Croatian kingdom.

Historical facts 
Gregory was the bishop of Nin and as such was under the strong protection of King Tomislav of Croatia. At the Synod in 925, held in Split, Gregory became subordinate to the Archbishop of Split. He rejected the offer of the Sisak Bishopric. After the conclusions of the first Synod Gregory complained again in 927/8 but was rejected and his Nin Bishopric was abolished, Gregory himself being transferred to the diocese of Skradin.

The statue 
Rubbing the statue's toe is said to bring good luck. The toe has been worn smooth and shiny as a result.

The statue was erected in September 1929 in the Peristyle of Diocletian's Palace and can be seen in postcards of the pre-World War II period. In 1941, the statue was moved outside the city by Italian occupying forces. In 1954, it was re-erected in a different location, to the north of the Palace and Old Town of Split, just outside the Golden Gate, where it currently sits. A major restoration of the monument took place between 2013 and 2015.

There are also statues of Gregory of Nin in the cities of Nin and Varaždin.

See also 
 History of Croatia
 History of Dalmatia

References

Further reading 
 John Van Antwerp Fine, John V. A. Fine, Jr., The Early Medieval Balkans: A Critical Survey from the Sixth to the Late Twelfth Century, University of Michigan Press, 1991 
 Florin Curta, Paul Stephenson, Southeastern Europe in the Middle Ages, 500–1250, Cambridge University Press, 2006 
 Andre Vauchez, Richard Barrie Dobson, Adrian Walford, Michael Lapidge, Encyclopedia of the Middle Ages, Routledge, 2000 
 

Roman Catholic bishops in Croatia
10th-century bishops
10th-century Croatian people
History of Dalmatia
Year of birth unknown
Year of death unknown